Laramie was a brand of cigarettes extant in the United States from the 1930s into the 1950s. Later, the name was used for a cigarette rolling kit. Laramie is currently a brand name for cigarette papers and cigarette tubes (rolling papers pre-formed into a tube, for use in home tobacco injector systems) marketed by HBI International.

In popular culture
Although they have been out of production since the 1950s, Laramie cigarettes have appeared on The Simpsons. In the show, they sponsor a child beauty pageant and have a corporate mascot named Menthol Moose, who can be seen at parades in Springfield. Laramie has also appeared in The Practice (season one, episode four), during a storyline about a tobacco lawsuit. In the 23rd episode of the 2nd season of The X-Files, Laramie Tobacco is mentioned as a missing person's former workplace.  Laramie was also the brand name used for cigarettes in the 1999 classic sci-fi horror game System Shock 2, but the packaging design resembled that of Marlboro; very similar to Morley (cigarette) from the tv show The X-Files.

See also
 List of rolling papers

References

Cigarette brands
Cigarette rolling papers